Jennie Ekström (born 16 June 1991) is a former Swedish Paralympic swimmer who competed in international level events. She was born with dysmelia; she doesn't have a left arm, hip or thigh and has scoliosis.

References

1991 births
Living people
Swimmers from Gothenburg
Sportspeople from Uppsala
Paralympic swimmers of Sweden
Swimmers at the 2008 Summer Paralympics
Swimmers at the 2012 Summer Paralympics
S4-classified Paralympic swimmers
Swedish female freestyle swimmers
Swedish female backstroke swimmers
Swedish female breaststroke swimmers
Swedish female medley swimmers
Medalists at the World Para Swimming European Championships
Medalists at the World Para Swimming Championships
20th-century Swedish women
21st-century Swedish women